Philomin Raj is a film editor who works in Tamil films. He is a frequent collaborator with Lokesh Kanagaraj.

Career 
Philomin Raj worked as an editor for the third season of Naalaya Iyukunar. He worked as an editor for Lokesh Kanagaraj's corporate advertisements and a television film before working on the film Maanagaram (2017). In a review of Maanagaram by The Hindu, the reviewer wrote that "The editing looks crisp shifting to the various characters and episodes leaving you curious about the rest". Raj garnered acclaim for his work in Kaithi (2019).

Personal life 
He married Dhivya Pradeepa in 2021.

Filmography

 Aviyal (2016; segment: Kalam)
 Maanagaram (2017)
 Vella Raja (2018) (web series)
 Mehandi Circus (2019)
 Raatchasi (2019)
 Kaithi (2019)
 Master (2021)
 Mandela (2021)
 Jai Bhim (2021)
 Taanakkaran (2022)
 Vikram (2022)
 Gulu Gulu (2022)
 Witness (2022)
 Leo – Bloody Sweet (2023)
 Maaveeran (2023)
 Japan (2023)

Awards and nominations

References

External links 
 

Living people
Tamil film editors
Year of birth missing (living people)